Grand Detour Township is located in Ogle County, Illinois. As of the 2010 census, its population was 698 and it contained 385 housing units.

Geography

Demographics

References

External links
 Us Census
 City-data.com
 Midwest Government Info

Townships in Ogle County, Illinois
Townships in Illinois